The 1976–77 daytime network television schedule for the three major English-language commercial broadcast networks in the United States covers the weekday and weekend daytime hours from September 1976 to August 1977.

Talk shows are highlighted in  yellow, local programming is white, reruns of older programming are orange, game shows are pink, soap operas are chartreuse, news programs are gold, children's programs are light purple and sports programs are light blue. New series are highlighted in bold.

PBS, the Public Broadcasting Service, was in operation, but the schedule was set by each local station.

Monday-Friday

Additional Information
♦ABC had a 6pm (ET)/5pm (CT) feed for their newscast
In the Pacific Time Zone (from December 1975 to March 1977), ABC's lineup had its game shows aired in the morning, while the 12 Noon to 3 PM block featured The Edge of Night, Ryan's Hope, All My Children, One Life to Live, and General Hospital in succession. After April 1977, ABC's Pacific Time Zone daytime schedule began matching that of its 10 AM-3:30PM Central Time schedule.

Saturday

Sunday

Notes

By network

ABC

Returning Series
The $20,000 Pyramid
ABC Evening News
All My Children
American Bandstand
The Edge of Night
Family Feud
General Hospital
Good Morning America
The Great Grape Ape Show
Happy Days 
Hot Seat
Issues and Answers
The New Adventures of Gilligan 
The Tom and Jerry Show
The Oddball Couple 
One Life to Live
Ryan's Hope
Schoolhouse Rock!
Super Friends 

New Series
Animals, Animals, Animals
The Better Sex
The Don Ho Show
Jabberjaw
Junior Almost Anything Goes!
The Krofft Supershow
The Mumbly Cartoon Show
The Scooby-Doo/Dynomutt Hour
Second Chance

Not Returning From 1975-76
The $10,000 Pyramid
AM America
Break the Bank
Devlin 
Groovie Goolies 
Let's Make a Deal
The Lost Saucer
Make a Wish
The Neighbors
Rhyme and Reason
Showoffs
Speed Buggy 
These Are the Days 
Uncle Croc's Block
You Don't Say!

CBS

Returning Series
All in the Family 
As the World Turns
The Bugs Bunny/Road Runner Hour
Camera Three
Captain Kangaroo
CBS Children's Film Festival
CBS Evening News
CBS Morning News
Clue Club
Face the Nation
Far Out Space Nuts 
Fat Albert and the Cosby Kids
Gambit
Guiding Light
The Hudson Brothers Razzle Dazzle Show 
Lamp Unto My Feet
Look Up and Live
Love of Life
Match Game
The Price Is Right
Search for Tomorrow
The Secrets of Isis
Shazam!
Sunrise Semester
Sylvester and Tweety
Tattletales
The Young and the Restless

New Series
Ark II
Double Dare
Here's Lucy 
The New Adventures of Batman
Tarzan, Lord of the Jungle
Way Out Games

Not Returning From 1975-76
The Edge of Night (moved to ABC)
The Ghost Busters
Give-n-Take
The Harlem Globetrotters Popcorn Machine 
Musical Chairs
The U.S. of Archie 
Valley of the Dinosaurs

NBC

Returning Series
Another World
Days of Our Lives
The Doctors
Frankenstein Jr. and the Impossibles 
The Gong Show
The Hollywood Squares
Land of the Lost
Meet the Press
Name That Tune
NBC Nightly News
NBC Saturday Night News
NBC Sunday Night News
The New Pink Panther Show
Sanford and Son 
Somerset
Space Ghost 
Speed Buggy 
Today
Wheel of Fortune
The Woody Woodpecker Show 

New Series
50 Grand Slam
Big John, Little John
Chico and the Man 
It's Anybody's Guess
The Kids From C.A.P.E.R.
Lovers and Friends
McDuff, the Talking Dog
Monster Squad
Muggsy
Shoot for the Stars
Stumpers!

Not Returning From 1975-76
Celebrity Sweepstakes
Emergency +4 
The Fun Factory
Go!
High Rollers 
Jackpot
The Magnificent Marble Machine
Return to the Planet of the Apes
Run, Joe, Run
The Secret Lives of Waldo Kitty
Sigmund and the Sea Monsters 
Take My Advice
Three for the Money
Westwind

See also
1976-77 United States network television schedule (prime-time)
1976-77 United States network television schedule (late night)

External links
 https://web.archive.org/web/20071015122215/http://curtalliaume.com/abc_day.html
 https://web.archive.org/web/20071015122235/http://curtalliaume.com/cbs_day.html
 https://web.archive.org/web/20071012211242/http://curtalliaume.com/nbc_day.html

United States weekday network television schedules
1976 in American television
1977 in American television